The Ala Moana Center, commonly known simply as Ala Moana, is a large open-air shopping mall in the Ala Moana neighborhood of Honolulu, Hawaii. Owned by Brookfield Properties, Ala Moana is the eighth largest shopping mall in the United States and the largest open-air shopping center in the world.

Ala Moana is consistently ranked among the most successful malls in the world. With assets totaling $5.74 billion as of January 2018, it is the most valuable shopping mall in the United States. It is anchored by Bloomingdale's, Macy's, Marshalls, Neiman Marcus, Nordstrom, Ross Dress for Less, Saks Off 5th, and Target.

History
Before the construction of the mall, the land was a wetland.  Dredging projects nearby spearheaded by Walter F. Dillingham created excess coral which filled the wetland, purchased by Dillingham in 1912 from the estate of Bernice Pauahi Bishop.  Land reclaimed, son and successor Lowell Dillingham initiated the Ala Moana Center project in 1948 and broke ground in 1957.

Initial development and design
The Ala Moana Center was developed and designed by Don Graham. Critics viewed Graham's unusual design, which oriented the mall away from the Pacific Ocean and included two levels for retail and parking, as a potential failure. However, the Ala Moana Center proved a success after its opening, and helped refocus the retail center of Oahu away from Downtown Honolulu. Graham worked as the center's first general manager after its opening.

Opening
When it opened in 1959, Ala Moana Center became the largest shopping mall in the United States. Brookfield Properties of Chicago currently owns and operates Ala Moana Center. Its original tenants included Sears, Roebuck and Company, F. W. Woolworth Company, Foodland, Longs Drugs, and Shirokiya, among other local shops. Ala Moana Center's second-phase expansion included the 1961 addition of the Ala Moana Office Building (including La Ronde, the first revolving restaurant in the United States), the 1966 addition of JCPenney and Liberty House in a new Diamond Head wing. In 1982, Ala Moana Center was purchased by a partnership of Japanese corporation, Daiei, and an insurance company. In 1995, Daiei became the sole owner. Once a management vendor for Daiei, General Growth Properties purchased Ala Moana Center in 1999.

Success and expansion
 
The Makai Market food court was built in 1987. A 1999 expansion added the Makai wing, with Neiman Marcus as a new anchor. A shopping complex and parking spaces were demolished just north of the mall in 2006 to make way for the Mauka wing, which was completed on March 7, 2008, and was anchored by Nordstrom.

In a June 26, 2009, report from U.S. News & World Report, Ala Moana was ranked as the second most profitable mall in America based on sales per square footage, and also had one of the highest occupancy rates, at 95%. The report described the flourishing mall as a gold mine, with annual sales of more than $1 billion.

Departure of Sears
On February 23, 2012, Sears Holdings Corporation announced it would close its store at Ala Moana Center by early 2013. Sears held its original location and had a presence at the mall since its opening in 1959. The closing was part of a $270 million sale of 11 Sears properties nationwide. The Wall Street Journal estimated that the Ala Moana Sears location was the largest portion of the deal, comprising between $200 million to $250 million of the overall sale price. The Ala Moana location closed permanently at 7 PM on June 2, 2013.

Ewa Wing expansion
On May 17, 2013, the owner of Ala Moana Center announced that Bloomingdale's would anchor and occupy  of a new and expanded  Ewa wing. The expanded wing opened on November 12, 2015, replacing the existing wing on the western end of the mall, including the space previously occupied by Sears. The new wing included Bloomingdale's and Nordstrom, which relocated from the north end of the mall, as anchors. On October 22, 2017, Target held its grand opening for its first store at a mall in Hawaii in the space formerly occupied by Nordstrom.

Architecture and layout

Costing US$25 million in 1959, Ala Moana Center had eighty-seven stores and four thousand parking spaces. Ala Moana Center was remodeled extensively in various phases.  New designs reflected modern Hawaiian architectural principles, emphasizing the importance of the symbolism of various natural phenomena found in Hawaii.  Asian Pacific Rim motifs have been adopted reflecting the large Asian population of residents in Hawaii.  For decades, a centerpiece of Ala Moana Center was its koi ponds.  In the Japanese culture, koi represents happiness and tranquility.  Despite these enhancements, the design of the center has been criticized for its over-built appearance and hodge-podge architecture, the result of years of modifications and expansions under different owners. Still, Ala Moana Center architecture and layouts inspired its owner in 2004 to invest over US$1 billion in remodeling various other shopping centers across Canada and the United States, using Ala Moana Center as a template.  As of 2018, Ala Moana is valued at nearly $6 billion and is the largest outdoor mall in the world.

Ala Moana Centerstage is one of the most popular public amphitheaters in Hawaii. On a stage in the center of the shopping complex, local talents are showcased for visitors to enjoy.  Hula dances are a staple for Ala Moana Centerstage as well as performances by the Royal Hawaiian Band, the oldest municipal band in the United States.  Schools throughout the country, as well as the world, travel to Honolulu just to be able to perform at Ala Moana Centerstage.

In addition, episodes of the local TV show Hawaii Stars, a singing competition, are usually filmed on this stage.  Onlookers can usually be seen crowding the second- and third-story balconies overlooking the stage during taping.

See also

 List of largest shopping malls in the world
 List of largest shopping malls in the United States
 Kahala Mall
 Pearlridge
 Windward Mall

References

External links

1959 establishments in Hawaii
Buildings and structures in Honolulu
Brookfield Properties
Shopping malls established in 1959
Shopping malls in Hawaii
Tourist attractions in Honolulu